Gicumbi Football Club is an association football club from Byumba, Rwanda. They currently compete in the Rwandan Second Division, and play their home games at the Gicumbi Stadium.

References

External links
Soccerway

Football clubs in Rwanda